was a Japanese video game publisher. It specialized in the development of visual novels for use on home video game consoles such as the PlayStation 2 and the Dreamcast.

History

Alchemist era
The company entered video game business in 2002.

In April 1, 2016, Alchemist filed its own bankruptcy to Sapporo court, with the same court began to process the request in April 5, 2016. The company's legal entity was unregistered in January 18, 2017.

Games published

Dreamcast
Baldr Force EXE
Chocolat: Maid Cafe Curio
Kimi ga Nozomu Eien
Princess Holiday: Korogaru Ringotei Senyaichiya
Tsuki wa Higashi ni Hi wa Nishi ni: Operation Sanctuary
Wind: A Breath of Heart

PlayStation 2
Aria the Natural: Tooi Yume no Mirage
Aria the Origination: Aoi Hoshi no El Cielo
Baldr Force EXE
Baldr Bullet: Equilibrium
Binchō-tan
Chocolat: Maid Cafe Curio
Duel Savior Destiny
Hana to Otome ni Shukufuku o: Harukaze no Okurimono
Haru no Ashioto: Step of Spring
Higurashi no Naku Koro ni Matsuri
Higurashi no Naku Koro ni Matsuri: Kakera Asobi
Pachi-Slot Higurashi no Naku Koro ni Matsuri
Katakamuna: Ushinawareta Ingaritsu
Koisuru Otome to Shugo no Tate: The Shield of AIGIS
Kono Aozora ni Yakusoku o: Melody of Sun and Sea
Otome wa Boku ni Koishiteru
Parfait Chocolat Second Style
Princess Holiday: Korogaru Ringotei Senyaichiya
Pure x Cure Recovery
Sekirei: Mirai Kara no Okurimono
Sugar + Spice!: Anoko no Suteki na Nanimokamo
Suzunone Seven!: Rebirth Knot
Triggerheart Exelica Enhanced
Tsuki wa Higashi ni Hi wa Nishi ni: Operation Sanctuary
Wind: A Breath of Heart

PlayStation 3
Gal Gun
Umineko no Naku Koro ni: Majo to Suiri no Rondo
Umineko no Naku Koro ni Chiru: Shinjitsu to Gensō no Nocturne

PlayStation 4
Gal Gun: Double Peace

PlayStation Portable
Dead End: Orchestral Manoeuvres in the Dead End
Higurashi Daybreak Portable
Higurashi Daybreak Portable Mega Edition
Kaitō Tenshi Twin Angel: Toki to Sekai no Meikyū
Koisuru Otome to Shugo no Tate Portable
Onigokko!
No Fate! Only the Power of Will
Otome wa Boku ni Koishiteru Portable
Otome wa Boku ni Koishiteru: Futari no Elder
Ouka Sengoku Portable
Saka Agari Hurricane Portable
Saki Portable
Soreyuke! Burunyanman Portable
Umineko no Naku Koro ni Portable
Ren'ai 0 Kilometer
Gaku Ou:The Royal Seven Stars
1/2 summer+
Your Diary +

PlayStation Vita
Gal Gun: Double Peace

Xbox 360
Gal Gun
No Fate! Only the Power of Will
Ōgon Musōkyoku X

Nintendo DS
Akai Ito DS
Akai Ito Destiny DS
Chō Kowai Hanashi DS: Ao no Shō
Higurashi no Naku Koro Ni Kizuna
Nicola Kanshū: Model * Oshare Audition

Nintendo 3DS
Downtown no Gaki no Tsukai ya Arahende!! Zettai ni Tsukamatte wa Ikenai Ghasu Kurobikari Land
Nicola Kanshū: Model * Oshare Audition 2

References

External links
Alchemist official website

Video game publishers
Defunct video game companies of Japan
Video game companies established in 1991
Video game companies disestablished in 2016
Companies that have filed for bankruptcy in Japan
Japanese companies disestablished in 2016
Japanese companies established in 1991